The Little Nottoway River is a  long tributary to the Nottoway River in the United States state of Virginia.  Located in the southeastern part of the state, it is part of the larger Chowan-Albemarle drainage.

Course
The Little Nottoway River starts at the confluence of Carys Creek and Mallorys Creek in the Piedmont of Virginia at an elevation of 340 feet.  It then flows roughly southeast to meet the Nottoway River at an elevation of 225 feet.  Excepting the forming tributaries, it has four streams running into it.

Watershed
The Little Nottoway River watershed is roughly half forested and half-open land.

Tributaries

River modifications
Crystal Lake on Lazaretto Creek is the only named impoundment in the watershed. Little Nottoway River enters the Nottoway River just upstream of Nottoway Reservoir.

See also
List of rivers of Virginia

References

USGS Geographic Names Information Service
USGS Hydrologic Unit Map - State of Virginia (1974)

Rivers of Virginia
Tributaries of Albemarle Sound